Gonuris is a genus of moths of the family Erebidae. The genus was erected by Heinrich Benno Möschler in 1880.

Species
Gonuris flaminia Möschler, 1880 Suriname
Gonuris leonnatus Schaus, 1914 French Guiana
Gonuris perdica (Stoll, [1782]) Suriname

References

Calpinae